The Society of Biblical Archaeology was founded in London in 1870 by Samuel Birch to further Biblical archaeology. It published a series of Proceedings in which some important papers read before the Society were preserved.

In 1919 the Society of Biblical Archaeology merged into the Royal Asiatic Society of Great Britain and Ireland.

References

1870 establishments in the United Kingdom
1919 disestablishments
Biblical Archaeology
Learned societies of the United Kingdom
Clubs and societies in London
Organizations established in 1870